Renata Voráčová and Barbora Záhlavová-Strýcová were the defending champions, but Záhlavová-Strýcová chose not to participate. Voráčová teamed up with Petra Cetkovská and successfully defended her title, defeating Barbora Krejčíková and Aleksandra Krunić in the final, 6–2, 4–6, [10–7].

Seeds

Draw

References 
 Draw

Open Gdf Suez De Biarritz - Doubles
ITS Cup